The Walkley Documentary Award is an Australian award presented annually since 2011 as part of the Walkley Awards. It recognises excellence in documentary production grounded in journalistic principles.

List of award winners

References 

Australian journalism awards
 Walkley Documentary Award
2011 establishments in Australia